Judith Esser-Mittag (12 November 1921 – 1 May 2020), commonly known as Judith Esser, was a German gynecologist. Her extensive studies of the female anatomy helped her improve the digital-style tampon.

The o.b. tampon
Women have improvised tampons and sanitary napkins for centuries, but the first modern commercially produced tampons were those marketed in the United States by Tampax from 1936. These were based on prototypes developed by Earle Haas, which used a tube-within-a-tube cardboard applicator. In 1947 the German auto engineer Carl Hahn and lawyer Heinz Mittag commissioned Esser-Mittag to improve on this design by developing a "digital" tampon, meaning one without an applicator, that could be inserted using one's digits (fingers).

The product was launched in 1950 as the "o.b. tampon". The name derives from the German term , meaning 'without napkin'. The o.b. tampon consists of rolled fiber-pad layers designed to expand uniformly from all sides, filling the vaginal cavity more completely than a less flexible tampon. It is therefore more efficient in guarding against leaks. Cotton and rayon layers achieve the necessary absorbency. Esser-Mittag's idea was to create a product that worked with a woman's body to offer the best protection. As an active swimmer she was dissatisfied with the options available for menstrual hygiene, and as a gynecologist she was in a position to take the initiative to find a better option for menstruating women. She was not satisfied with pads because they could not be worn in water and thought that applicator tampons were uncomfortable and did not conform to the woman's body. A tampon without an applicator had the advantages that it was easy to insert, comfortable, and provided good protection.

Later developments
After the invention of this new tampon, the product was mass-produced throughout the mid-20th century with the help of the Carl Hahn Company in Germany. This company, as well as the idea for the digital o.b. tampon, was later sold and eventually bought by Johnson & Johnson in 1974. In 1984, an advertisement for o.b. tampons aired on American television with the inventor Esser-Mittag. The o.b. tampon now comes in three sizes and three absorbencies. The o.b. brand continues to retain a board-certified gynecologist and research team to pursue Esser-Mittag's vision for innovative options for women.

By creating a tampon without an applicator, Esser-Mittag also created a more environmentally friendly product.

See also 

 Feminine hygiene

References

1921 births
2020 deaths
German gynaecologists
20th-century German inventors
German women physicians
20th-century German physicians
Women inventors
Women gynaecologists
20th-century women physicians
20th-century German women